Kuyaki or Kuyeki may refer to:
 Kuyaki-ye Aziz
 Kuyaki-ye Hasan
 Kuyaki-ye Mahmud
 Kuyaki-ye Majid